Lorenzo R. Bauzá (3 October 1917 – 22 December 1971) was a Uruguayan chess player, five-time Uruguayan Chess Championship winner (1945, 1950, 1951, 1954, 1955).

Biography
From the mid-1940s to begin 1960s Lorenzo Bauzá was one of Uruguayan leading chess players. He five time won Uruguayan Chess Championships: 1945, 1950, 1951, 1954, and 1955. Lorenzo Bauzá two times participated in World Chess Championship South American Zonal tournaments (1951, 1954).

Lorenzo Bauzá played for Uruguay in the Chess Olympiad:
 In 1962, at fourth board in the 15th Chess Olympiad in Varna (+8, =5, -6).

References

External links

Lorenzo Bauzá chess games at 365chess.com

1917 births
1971 deaths
Uruguayan chess players
Chess Olympiad competitors
20th-century chess players